Alban Crocker Stimers (June 5, 1827 – June 3, 1876) was a Chief Engineer with the United States Navy. His later career was marred by the scandal which enveloped the Casco-class monitors after they were found to be unseaworthy.

Career
Stimers was born in New York in 1827. He entered the Navy as a Third Assistant Engineer in January 1849 and became a Chief Engineer in July 1858. He served in the steam frigate Roanoke during the early months of the Civil War and later in 1861 was assigned to work with John Ericsson on the construction of the ironclad turret ship Monitor. Though not formally a member of Monitors complement, Stimers took part in her difficult voyage from New York to Hampton Roads, Virginia, and served on board during her historic battle with the Confederate ironclad  on 9 March 1862. Much of the success of these two operations was due to his inspired work, and Chief Engineer Stimers continued an intimate association with the Navy's ironclad shipbuilding program for much of the rest of the Civil War.

In 1862–63, Stimers again worked with Ericsson during the building of the next class of monitor-type ironclads, the Passaic class. He accompanied these ships during early operations against the Confederacy, most notably the 7 April 1863 bombardment of Fort Sumter, in Charleston Harbor, South Carolina, and helped repair them after that action.

Later in the year he was placed in charge of an ambitious project to construct twenty light-draft monitors for use in shallow inland waters. Unfortunately, the displacement calculations made for these ships were badly done. The resulting Casco class turned out to be useless for their intended role and had to be extensively modified. Stimers had inadvertently demonstrated the inherent difficulty of successfully shepherding complex technological endeavors, something that has bedeviled "project managers" from his time to ours.

After the Casco class debacle, Stimers returned to the seagoing Navy. At the beginning of 1865, he was Chief Engineer of the steam frigate Wabash. He resigned from the Navy in August 1865, and became a consultant. He died of smallpox on June 3, 1876, survived by his wife and five children.

Published works
 (Google eBook)

See also

References

Further reading
 Wegner, Dana M., Alban C. Stimers and the Office of the General Inspector of Ironclads, 1862–1864, Master's thesis, State University of New York College at Oneonta, 1979.
 Roberts, William H., Civil War Ironclads: The U.S. Navy and Industrial Mobilization (Baltimore: Johns Hopkins University Press, 2002).

1827 births
1876 deaths
Union Navy officers
United States Navy officers
People of New York (state) in the American Civil War